Trinity High School is a Roman Catholic high school located in Dickinson, North Dakota.  It is located in the Roman Catholic Diocese of Bismarck.  It currently serves about 253 students and is a part of the Trinity Catholic Schools system.

Athletics
The athletic teams at Trinity are called the Titans.

Championships
North Dakota Class B high school boys' basketball: 2004, 2006
North Dakota Class A high school football: 1979
North Dakota Class AA high school football: 2000, 2001, 2005
State Class B boys' track and field: 2002, 2003, 2006, 2018

External links
Dickinson Trinity website

Roman Catholic Diocese of Bismarck
Private middle schools in North Dakota
Catholic secondary schools in North Dakota
Schools in Stark County, North Dakota
Educational institutions established in 1961
North Dakota High School Activities Association (Class B)
North Dakota High School Activities Association (Class AA Football)
Dickinson, North Dakota
1961 establishments in North Dakota